"Me Amaras" (English: "You'll Love Me") is the first single from Ricky Martin's second studio solo album Me Amaras. It was released on January 25, 1993.

A music video was also released.

The song reached number six on the Hot Latin Songs in the United States.

Formats and track listings
Latin America promotional 12" single
"Me Amaras" – 4:29

Brazilian promotional 12" single
"Me Amaras (Portuguese version)" – 4:26

Charts

Weekly charts

Year-end charts

References

1993 singles
Ricky Martin songs
Spanish-language songs
Songs written by Juan Carlos Calderón
Pop ballads
1993 songs
Song recordings produced by Juan Carlos Calderón